WKZI is a Christian radio station licensed to Casey, Illinois, broadcasting on 800 kHz AM. The station is owned by American Hope Communications.

History
The station began broadcasting December 14, 1963, and was owned by Paul Dean Ford. It initially aired a big band format. By 1968, the station had adopted a country music format, which it continued to air until 1992. It was taken silent in 1992. In 1993, WKZI was transferred to Word Power, Inc., a nonprofit run by the Ford family, and the station adopted its current Christian format.

In 2021, the station was sold to American Hope Communications, along with WLHW, WPFR, WPFR-FM, and three translators, for $179,000.

References

External links

KZI
Moody Radio affiliate stations
Radio stations established in 1963
1963 establishments in Illinois